TotalTV is a Canadian telecommunications company and broadcast distribution provider launched in 2013 as Zazeen TV. It provides IPTV television service in urban areas of Ontario and Quebec.

Services

Television
TotalTV is a traditional subscription television service delivered via IPTV.  All TotalTV subscriptions must be paired with high speed Internet service from the Distributel family of brands or another eligible TotalTV agent.

Rebranding

In September 2020, Zazeen was rebranded to TotalTV.  As part of the name change, new customers are no longer able to directly sign up for service.  Instead, signing up for new service must be made via Distributel or a Distributel affiliated ISP.  Also unlike Zazeen, TotalTV no longer offers Internet or VoIP services.

References

External links
 

Telecommunications companies of Canada
Internet service providers of Canada
IPTV companies of Canada
Telecommunications companies established in 2013
2013 establishments in Ontario
Companies based in Mississauga